The SHAFTA Awards ("Soft and Hard Adult Film and Television Awards") are an annual film award ceremony for pornographic films in the United Kingdom, described by the organisers of the event as the "UK Oscars of Porn", while AVN state it is the highlight of the British adult film calendar.

Voting is open to any subscriber of Television X. As winners are determined by fan votes, nominees have used social media to encouraging people to vote for them. The term SHAFTA was chosen as a portmanteau of BAFTA and penis shaft, with the full name being a backronym.

History 
The first SHAFTA ceremony was held in 2010 and it was organised by Television X. The 2011 SHAFTAs were held in London on 9 March at the For Your Eyes Only club. Celebrities attending the event included Billi Bhatti, Dane Bowers and Tim Westwood. The 2012 SHAFTAs were held on 15 March at Platinum Lace, which is a strip club on Coventry Street in London. The event was hosted by Tanya Tate, who won the MILF of the Year award for the third year in a row. A minor controversy was caused when transsexual star Holly Harlow was nominated for Best New Starlet, but Television X defended the choice stating that "the term starlet fits her perfectly, she is feminine, sexy and a great performer". Award presenters included Danny Dyer, Lethal Bizzle and Terry Coldwell from East 17. ICM Registry co-sponsored the event along with Television X, and the event was streamed live on the awards' official website. Ben Dover was presented with an honorary award, entitled The Palm Phwoar for "endeavours in adult entertainment" over his 33 years in the industry. The 2013 SHAFTAs were held on 5 December at the Rise Superclub in Leicester Square. The 2016 SHAFTAs were held at The Rah Rah Room on London's Piccadilly and hosted by Benedict Garrett. The 1920s themed event was attended by the UK press, porn industry and celebrity guests including Big Brother housemate Marco Pierre White Jr and Geordie Shore's Marty McKenna and David Hawley.

Winners

References

External links 
 Official SHAFTA website

Pornographic film awards
Adult industry awards
British awards
British pornography